Rapala pheretima, the copper flash, is a species of lycaenid or gossamer-winged butterfly found in Asia.

Subspecies
Rapala pheretima pheretima (Borneo, Sumatra)
Rapala pheretima petosiris (Hewitson, 1863) (Nepal, Sikkim, Assam to northern Thailand)
Rapala pheretima sequeira (Distant, 1885) (southern Thailand, Burma, Peninsular Malaya, Langkawi, Singapore)
Rapala pheretima tiomana Eliot, 1978 (Pulau Tioman)
Rapala pheretima sakaia Fruhstorfer, 1912 (Java)
Rapala pheretima guevara Fruhstorfer, 1912 (Borneo)

References

Butterflies of Asia
Rapala (butterfly)
Butterflies of Singapore
Butterflies of Borneo